Averinsky (masculine), Averinskaya (feminine), or Averinskoye (neuter) is the name of several rural localities in Russia:
Averinsky, rural locality (a khutor) in Sulyayevskoye Rural Settlement, Kumylzhensky District, Volgograd Oblast
Averinskaya, Vologda Oblast, rural locality (a village) in Dvinitskoye Rural Settlement, Syamzhensky District, Vologda Oblast
Averinskaya, Yaroslavl Oblast, rural locality (a village) in Ilinskoye Rural Settlement, Uglichsky District, Yaroslavl Oblast